Lac d'Arrious is a lake in Pyrénées-Atlantiques, France. At an elevation of 2285 m, its surface area is 0.025 km².

Lakes of Pyrénées-Atlantiques